Nikas may refer to:


Surname 
Ilias Nikas (born 1964), Greek judoka
Panny Nikas (born 1988), Australian footballer

Given name 
Nikas Safronov (born 1956), Soviet and Russian artist

Places 
Tulsiyahi Nikas, is a village development committee in Dhanusa District in the Janakpur Zone of south-eastern Nepal

See also 
Hisab Nikas, is an Odia film
Nika (disambiguation)